Daşduz (also, Dashduz and Dash-duz) is a settlement in the municipality of Nakhchivan in Nakhchivan City, Nakhchivan Autonomous Republic, Azerbaijan. It is located 12 km in the south-west from the Nakhchivan city, on the foothill area. There is no permanent population.

Etymology
The name of the Daşduz settlement made out from the component of the Turkic words of Daş (the rock, stone) and duz (salt) means "the rock-salt". The settlement was so named because the rock-salt mine of Nakhchivan is located in this territory.

References

Populated places in Azerbaijan
Nakhchivan (city)